Chiloglottis reflexa, commonly known as the short-clubbed wasp orchid, is a species of orchid endemic to the south-eastern Australia. It has two broad leaves and a single greenish-bronze or purplish flower with an ant-like callus covering most of the top of the labellum.

Description
The callus resembles a large black ant surrounded by thin, stalked glands and covers most of the labellum. The column has narrow wings. Flowering occurs from December to May.

Taxonomy and naming
This orchid species was first formally described in 1806 by Jacques Labillardière who gave it the name Epipactis reflexa and published the description in Novae Hollandiae Plantarum Specimen. In 1917 George Claridge Druce changed the name to Chiloglottis reflexa. The specific epithet (reflexa) is a Latin word meaning "bent" or "turned back".

Distribution and habitat
The short-clubbed wasp orchid grows in a wide range of habitats but is most common in coastal and near-coastal forest and heath. It occurs in New South Wales south from the Blue Mountains, in southern Victoria and in Tasmania.

References

External links 
 
 

reflexa
Orchids of New South Wales
Orchids of Victoria (Australia)
Plants described in 1806